Novaya Kazanovka is a rural locality (a village) in Denisovsky Selsoviet, Meleuzovsky District, Bashkortostan, Russia. The population was 240 as of 2010. There are two streets.

Geography 
Novaya Kazanovka is located 23 km northwest of Meleuz (the district's administrative centre) by road. Saitovo is the nearest rural locality.

References 

Rural localities in Meleuzovsky District